De Andreis (or de Andreis) is a surname. Notable with this surname are:

 Felix de Andreis (1778-1820), first superior of the Lazarists in the U.S. and Vicar-General of  upper Louisiana in St. Louis
 Fernando de Andreis (born 1976), Argentine politician and current General Secretary of the Presidency of the Nation

See also 
 Andreis